Open Knowledge Foundation (OKF) is a global, non-profit network that promotes and shares information at no charge, including both content and data. It was founded by Rufus Pollock on 20 May 2004 in Cambridge, UK. It is incorporated in England and Wales as a private company limited by guarantee. Between May 2016 and May 2019 the organisation was named Open Knowledge International, but decided in May 2019 to return to Open Knowledge Foundation.

Aims 
The aims of Open Knowledge Foundation are:

Promoting the idea of open knowledge, both what it is, and why it is a good idea.
Running open knowledge events, such as OKCon.
Working on open knowledge projects, such as Open Economics or Open Shakespeare.
Providing infrastructure, and potentially a home, for open knowledge projects, communities and resources. For example, the KnowledgeForge service and CKAN.
Acting at UK, European and international levels on open knowledge issues.

People 
Renata Ávila Pinto joined as the new Chief Executive Officer of the Open Knowledge Foundation in October 2021. From February 2019 to August 2020, Catherine Stihler served as CEO. She left the Open Knowledge Foundation to become the CEO of Creative Commons. Between 2015–2017 Pavel Richter took on the role of CEO of Open Knowledge Foundation. Pavel was formerly Executive Director of Wikimedia Deutschland.

The Open Knowledge Foundation Advisory Council includes people from the areas of open access, open data, open content, open science, data visualization and digital rights. In 2015, it consisted of:

Andrew Stott
Becky Hogge
Benjamin Mako Hill
Carolina Rossini
Christopher Corbin
Daniel Dietrich
Denis Parfenov
Peter Murray-Rust
Sören Auer
Glyn Moody 
Hannes Gassert
Lynn M.Combs-Heard
Jordan S. Hatcher
Jo Walsh
Mark Surman
Mayo Fuster Morell
Nat Torkington
Pieter Colpaert
Hans Rosling
John Naughton
Nigel Shadbolt
Panagiotis Bamidis
Peter Suber
Yasodara Cordova

Network 
As of 2018, Open Knowledge Foundation has 11 official chapters and 38 groups in different countries.  In November 2022, the Open Knowledge Network was relaunched with two new projects.

It also supports 19 working groups.

 Lobbying Transparency
 Open Access
 Open Bibliography
 Open Definition
 Open Design & Hardware
 Open Development
 Open Economics
 Open Education
 OpenGLAM
 Open Government Data
 Open Humanities
 Open Linguistics
 Open Product Data
 Open Science
 OpenSpending
 Open Sustainability
 Open Transport (project)
 Personal Data and Privacy
 Public Domain

Operations 

Many of Open Knowledge Foundation's projects are technical in nature. Its most prominent project, CKAN, is used by many of the world's governments to host open catalogues of data that their countries possess.

The organisation tends to support its aims by hosting infrastructure for semi-independent projects to develop. This approach to organising was hinted as one of its earliest projects was a project management service called KnowledgeForge, which runs on the KForge platform. KnowledgeForge allows sectoral working groups to have space to manage projects related to open knowledge. More widely, the project infrastructure includes both technical and face-to-face aspects. The organisation hosts several dozen mailing lists for virtual discussion, utilises IRC for real-time communications and also hosts events.

Advocacy 
Open Knowledge Foundation is an active partner with organisations working in similar areas, such as open educational resources.

Open Knowledge Foundation has produced the Open Knowledge Definition, an attempt to clarify some of the ambiguity surrounding the terminology of openness, as well as the Open Software Service Definition. It also supported the development of the Open Database License (ODbL).

Outside of technology, Open Knowledge Foundation plays a role in advocating for openness broadly. This includes supporting the drafting of reports, facilitating consultation and producing guides.

Rufus Pollock, one of Open Knowledge Foundation's founders, and current board secretary sits on the UK government's Public Sector Transparency Board.

Technical 
 
The foundation places a strong interest in the use of open source technologies. Its software projects are hosted on GitHub, which utilises the Git version control software. Some of the projects are listed below:

CKAN, a tool that provides store for metadata. This enables governments to quickly and cheaply provide a catalogue of their data.
 Datahub, a community-run catalogue of useful sets of data on the Internet. Depending on the type of data (and its conditions of use), Datahub may also be able to store a copy of the data or host it in a database, and provide some basic visualisation tools.
 Frictionless Data, a collection of standards and tools for publishing data.
 Open bibliography, broadly construed as efforts to catalogue and build tools for working with and publishing bibliographic resources, with particular emphasis on those works that are in the public domain and public domain calculators. Examples include the Bibliographica, Public Domain Works, Open Shakespeare, Open Text Book and The Public Domain Review projects.
 OpenGLAM, an initiative that promotes free and open access to digital cultural heritage, held by GLAMs: Galleries, Libraries, Archives and Museums. OpenGLAM is co-funded by the European Commission as part of the DM2E (Digitised Manuscripts to Europeana) project.
 Open Economics
 Open Knowledge Forums
 Information Accessibility Initiative
 Open geodata
 Guide to open data licensing
 "Get the Data" — a web-site for questions and answer on how to get data sets.
 POD - Product Open Data

Events 
Much of the collaboration with other related organisations occurs via events that the foundation hosts. Its premier event is the Open Knowledge Conference (OKCon), which has been held occasionally since 2007. Other events have been organised within the areas of data visualisation and free information network infrastructure.

Annually, Open Knowledge Foundation supports International Open Data Day

Panton Principles and Fellowships (Open data in Science)
The Panton Principles (for Open Data in Science) in 2010 had large contributions from Open Knowledge people and in 2011 Jonathan Gray and Peter Murray-Rust successfully obtained funding from OSF for two fellowships, held by Sophie Kershaw and Ross Mounce. In 2013 OKF obtained sponsorship from CCIA for 3 fellowships, which were awarded to Rosemarie Graves, Sam Moore, and Peter Kraker.

Other

Open Knowledge Foundation also supports Apps for Europe, and D-CENT, a European project created to share and organise data from seven countries, which ran from October 2013 to May 2016.

See also 
 Access to Knowledge movement
 Free Knowledge Foundation
 Open Data Institute
 Open education
 Tactical Technology Collective

References

External links 

A self-published history of the Open Knowledge Foundation

Access to Knowledge movement
Articles containing video clips
Companies based in Cambridge
Free and open-source software organizations
Information technology organisations based in the United Kingdom
Non-profit organisations based in the United Kingdom
Open content
Organisations based in Cambridge
Organizations established in 2004
Public domain